Muri is a village in Mulgi Parish in Viljandi County in southern Estonia. It borders the villages Suuga, Tuhalaane and Morna as well as other villages in the former parishes of Halliste and Paistu.

References

Villages in Viljandi County